Axel Hallberg (born 12 June 1999) is a Swedish politician from the Green Party. He was previously associated with Young Greens. He was Baby of the House from September 2021 to May 2022.

See also 

 List of members of the Riksdag, 2018–2022

References 

1999 births
Living people
Swedish environmentalists

21st-century Swedish politicians
Members of the Riksdag 2018–2022
Members of the Riksdag from the Green Party
People from Lund